was a province of Japan in the area that is today the eastern part of Yamaguchi Prefecture. It was sometimes called . Suō bordered on Aki, Iwami, and Nagato Provinces.

The ancient provincial capital was in Hōfu. Suō was ruled for much of the Muromachi period by the Ōuchi clan, who built a castle at Yamaguchi. In the Sengoku period it was conquered by the Mōri clan, and was ruled remotely by them for much of the Edo period.

Shrines and temples

Tamanoya jinja was the chief Shinto shrine (ichinomiya) of Suō.

Historical districts
 Yamaguchi Prefecture
 Kuga District (玖珂郡)
 Kumage District (熊毛郡)
 Ōshima District (大島郡)
 Saba District (佐波郡) – dissolved
 Tsuno District (都濃郡) – dissolved
 Yoshiki District (吉敷郡) – dissolved

Maps

See also
 List of Historic Sites of Japan (Yamaguchi)
 Yamaguchi Prefectural Museum
 Iwakuni Domain
 Tokuyama Domain
 Shūnan City

Notes

References
 Nussbaum, Louis-Frédéric and Käthe Roth. (2005).  Japan encyclopedia. Cambridge: Harvard University Press. ;  OCLC 58053128

External links 

 "Suō Province" at JapaneseCastleExplorer.com
  Murdoch's map of provinces, 1903

Former provinces of Japan